Otto Ludwig (29 November 193417 August 2014) was a German footballer who played for FC Basel during the late 1950s and early 60s. He played in the position of striker.

Football career
Ludwig came to FC Basel as a youth player in 1955. He played his Swiss Cup debut on 18 December 1955 in the 6–2 win against Emmenbrücke. He played his Nationalliga A debut on 31 August 1958 in the away game against La Chaux-de-Fonds that Basel lost 2–1. He scored his first goal for his club on 14 September 1958 against Lausanne-Sport as Basel won 5–0. It was the last goal of the game.

For the season 1960/61 Ludwig played for Old Boys in the 1. Liga, then the third tier of the Swiss football league system. After that season he returned to FC Basel. In the season 1961/62 he played in 18 league games scoring 5 goals. In the season 1962/63 he played 17 league games scoring one goal. On 15 April 1963 the Wankdorf Stadium hosted the Cup Final and Basel played against favorites Grasshopper Club. Two goals after half time, one by Heinz Blumer and the second from Ludwig himself gave Basel a 2–0 victory and their third Cup win in the club's history. He played the full 90 minutes. His FCB period ended on 9 June 1963 in the last championship game of that season against FC Sion with an 8-1.

Between the years 1955 to 1960 and 1961 to 1963 Ludwig played a total of 92 games for Basel scoring a total of 17 goals. 55 of these games were in the Swiss Serie A, 12 in the Swiss Cup, five in the UEFA Intertoto Cup and 20 were friendly games. He scored 9 goal in the domestic league, one in the Swiss Cup, two in the UEFA Intertoto Cup and the other five were scored during the test games.

Despite winning the Cup title, in the summer of 1963 Ludwig then moved on to Schaffhausen who also played in the Nationalliga A. But that season they suffered relegation to the Nationalliga B. He stayed at the club for another year and returned to Basel to play with the Basel older generation. He was a capable player, who became a real crowd favorite of his time, probably due to his rather small body size.

Private life 
Otto Ludwig grew up in the Basel Breite quarter. He was married. Professionally he worked for the chemical industry, mainly for Hoffmann La Roche. A serious illness, which he patiently endured, shaped his last years. On August 17, 2014, he was released from his suffering.

Honours and Titles
Basel
 Swiss Cup winner: 1962-63

References

Sources
 Rotblau: Jahrbuch Saison 2017/2018. Publisher: FC Basel Marketing AG. 
 Die ersten 125 Jahre. Publisher: Josef Zindel im Friedrich Reinhardt Verlag, Basel. 
 Verein "Basler Fussballarchiv" Homepage

FC Basel players
BSC Old Boys players
FC Schaffhausen players
German footballers
Association football forwards
1934 births
2014 deaths